Lesopitron (E-4424) is a selective full agonist of the 5-HT1A receptor which is structurally related to the azapirones. In 2001 it was under development by Esteve as an anxiolytic for the treatment of generalized anxiety disorder (GAD). It made it to phase II clinical trials but was apparently discontinued as no new information on lesopitron has surfaced since.

See also 
 Sunepitron

References 

Piperazines
Pyrazoles
Aminopyrimidines
Chloroarenes